The Arco Valley Pearl is a white  natural blister baroque pearl with pink and yellow overtones. It measures 79 x 41 x 34 mm. It is the largest natural pearl outside a museum and the second biggest ever.  Mongolian emperor Khubilai Khan reportedly gave it to Marco Polo.

During 2007, an UAE collectionner said he bought the pearl from a French owner for 8M US$ but it is still owned by a European company (August 2008).

External links
 Arco-Valley Pearl
 Arco-Valley Pearl by Dr. Shihaan M. Larif

Individual pearls